Teucrium balfourii is a species of flowering plant in the family Lamiaceae. It is found only in the Socotra Islands, part of the nation of Yemen. Its natural habitat is rocky areas.

References

balfourii
Endemic flora of Socotra
Least concern plants
Plants described in 1907
Taxonomy articles created by Polbot